Bolitotherus cornutus is a North American species of darkling beetle known as the horned fungus beetle or forked fungus beetle. All of its life stages are associated with the fruiting bodies of a wood-decaying shelf fungus, commonly Ganoderma applanatum, Ganoderma tsugae, and Ganoderma lucidum.

Description
They are sexually dimorphic; males have two sets of horns and females lack horns. Males use their horns, clypeal and thoracic, to compete for mates. Unlike many species of scarab beetles that exhibit male dimorphism for horns with major and minor morphs, male B. cornutus possess a continuous range of horn and body sizes. Adult horned fungus beetles are active at night, but may be found during the day on the undersides of their host fungi.

Reproductive behavior
Bolitotherus cornutus adults perform reproductive behaviors on the surfaces of fruiting bodies of their host fungus. Mating pairs engage in a courtship ritual in which the male grips the female's elytra, with his thorax over the end of her abdomen. Courtship often lasts several hours, and is a necessary precursor to copulation. During a copulation attempt, the male reverses position on top of the female so that both individuals point the same direction and their abdomens are aligned. If the courtship is successful, the female opens her anal sternite and copulation takes place. Following copulation, the male remains on top, facing the same direction as the female, and mate-guards her. The male remains in this position for several hours, preventing other males from courting the female.  Later, the female will deposit single eggs on the upper surface of a host fungus, then cover each egg with a distinctive dark brown oval of frass. When the eggs hatch, the larvae burrow into and consume the fungus, in which they later pupate before emerging as adults.

Parasites
Some larvae die after attack by an uncharacterized parasitic fungus, or when parasitized by a braconid wasp, Eubadizon orchesiae, that makes a light yellow silken cocoon in the body of the larva.

References

Tenebrionidae
Articles containing video clips
Beetles of North America
Beetles described in 1794